Trop c'est trop (Too Much Is Too Much) is a French comedy film directed by Didier Kaminka in 1975

Didier (Kaminka), Philippe (Ogouz) and Georges (Beller) were born the same day at the same hour in the same room as the war was ending. A few years later, in school, the three boys are courting, each in his way, the beautiful Edina (Claudia Wells), also born at the same time, such affection leave quite indifferent, so that it does not hesitate to denounce them when are too urgent. In the age of thirty, the three friends yet still have not reached their goal and they are desperate to do this one day, Edina has indeed disappeared. Abandoning the idea to live without her, the three men set off in his research and eventually find her exposed to the advances of a fashion photographer they get rid laboriously after escaping three babes enamored, Patricia (Claude Jade), Carole (Chantal Goya) and Nicole (Nicole Jamet). Only in Hell, after the accidental death of Edina, the triple suicide and a short passage to Paradise Didier Georges and Philippe will finally realize their dream! ...

Cast 

 Georges Beller: Georges
 Philippe Ogouz: Philippe 
 Didier Kaminka: Didier
 Claude Jade: Patricia
 Chantal Goya: Carole
 Nicole Jamet: Nicole
 Darry Cowl: Lucifer
 Marcel Dalio: Saint-Pierre
 Claudia Wells: Edina
 José Luis de Vilallonga: The photographer
 Les Charlots: Three Guys
 Daniel Gélin: A Policeman
 Bernard Menez: The Priest
 Pierre Richard.: A Policeman
 Rufus: A Policeman
 Raymond Bussières: Monsieur Taxi
 Jean Carmet
 Daniel Prévost
 Yves Robert
 Patrick Topaloff

External links 

French comedy films
1970s French films